Lipovets is a rural locality (a settlement) in Vinnikovsky Selsoviet Rural Settlement, Kursky District, Kursk Oblast, Russia. Population:

Geography 
The settlement is located 111 km from the Russia–Ukraine border, 14 km north-east of the district center – the town Kursk, 2 km from the selsoviet center – 1st Vinnikovo.

 Climate
Lipovets has a warm-summer humid continental climate (Dfb in the Köppen climate classification).

Transport 
Lipovets is located 8.5 km from the federal route  (Kursk – Voronezh –  "Kaspy" Highway; a part of the European route ), 1.5 km from the road of regional importance  (Kursk – Kastornoye), on the road of intermunicipal significance  (38K-016 – 1st Vinnikovo – Lipovets, with the access road to Malinovy), 1.5 km from the nearest railway halt 18 km (railway line Kursk – 146 km).

The rural locality is situated 13 km from Kursk Vostochny Airport, 127 km from Belgorod International Airport and 191 km from Voronezh Peter the Great Airport.

References

Notes

Sources

Rural localities in Kursky District, Kursk Oblast